Kevin Osei-Kuffour Amankwaah (born 19 May 1982) is a former English footballer who played as a defender. Amankwaah enjoyed successful stints at Bristol City and Swindon Town.

Early life
Awankwaah was born in Harrow, London to Ghanaian parents.

Club career
He began his career as a trainee with Bristol City, turning professional in June 2000. He made his first team debut on 18 March 2000, replacing Matt Hewlett as a late substitute in the 1–1 draw away to Oldham Athletic and soon became a regular squad member.

Amankwaah received neck injuries in a car crash in March 2002 when he and teammate Aaron Brown were travelling in a car driven by former City trainee Rohan King which collided with another vehicle. He was given a new two-year contract while injured, but struggled to re-establish himself at Ashton Gate after returning from injury, having loan spells at Torquay United in January 2003, and Cheltenham Town in August 2003.

He eventually left Ashton Gate in February 2005, when he signed for Yeovil Town, initially on loan, and then on a permanent basis. Amankwaah signed for Swansea City in July 2006 for a fee of £250,000.

Amankwaah joined Swindon Town in June 2008. He played 89 games for the club, scoring 5 goals before being released on 31 August 2011. Amankwaah still had 6 months to run on his contract when he was released.

On 2 July 2012, Amankwaah signed for League Two side Exeter City on a free transfer. On 30 April 2013, he was released by Exeter along with 3 other players after the expiry of his contract.

After a successful trial with Northampton Town, Amankwaah signed a one-year contract with the option of a further year on 29 July 2013. He made 24 appearances for the Cobblers before having his contract terminated on 23 January 2014. On 17 February 2014, Amankwaah signed for Conference Premier side Salisbury City, making 14 appearances for the Whites.

Amankwaah signed for Sutton United in September 2014. He made a total of 21 full and two substitute league appearances in the 2014–15 season, scoring his first goal for the club when he volleyed in a corner in the last seconds of the game against Chelmsford City on 4 April 2015 to claim a 1–0 victory for Sutton.

Amankwaah made 28 full and three substitute league appearances in the 2015–16 season, helping the U's to lift the National League South title. He netted his second league goal from another corner against Margate on 9 April 2016, a game which Sutton went on to win 4–0.

Amankwaah scored his first goal in Sutton's 2016–17 National League campaign when he scored a consolation goal in a 3–1 away defeat to Dover Athletic on 4 October 2016. On 19 October 2016, it was announced that Amankwaah had signed a one-year contract extension with Sutton United and will stay with the club until the end of the 2017–18 season.

Amankwaah made his 100th career appearance for Sutton on 3 December 2016 in a 2–1 win against League Two club Cheltenham Town in the FA Cup 2nd round. He went on to appear in every round of Sutton's historic run to the 5th round of the FA Cup for the first time ever, including appearances in a 3–1 victory over local rivals AFC Wimbledon of League One on 17 January 2017, a 1–0 victory over Championship side Leeds United on 29 January and an eventual 0–2 defeat to Premier League club Arsenal on 20 February.

International career
Amankwaah was capped by England at under-18 level, making his only appearance in the 2–0 win over Luxembourg in April 2000. In August 2006, he spoke of his ambitions of playing for Ghana.

Controversy
Amankwaah was at the centre of controversy when he made a remark to Millwall player Neil Harris, taunting him about his battle with testicular cancer during a match between Millwall and Swindon. Amankwaah then apologised after the game after his remark was made public, and also made a donation to Everymans Cancer Charity. Harris accepted the apology at first but then withdrew his acceptance after Amankwaah tried to justify his claims for making the remark.

Statistics

Honours
Yeovil Town
League Two: 2004–05

Sutton United
National League South: 2015–16

References

External links

1982 births
Living people
Footballers from Harrow, London
English footballers
England youth international footballers
Association football defenders
Bristol City F.C. players
Torquay United F.C. players
Cheltenham Town F.C. players
Yeovil Town F.C. players
Swansea City A.F.C. players
Swindon Town F.C. players
Burton Albion F.C. players
Rochdale A.F.C. players
Exeter City F.C. players
Northampton Town F.C. players
Salisbury City F.C. players
Sutton United F.C. players
Bath City F.C. players
Salisbury F.C. players
English Football League players
National League (English football) players
Black British sportspeople
English people of Ghanaian descent